Oconostota (c. 1707–1783) was a Cherokee skiagusta (war chief) of Chota, which was for nearly four decades the primary town in the Overhill territory, and within what is now Monroe County, Tennessee. He served as the First Beloved Man of Chota from 1775 to 1781.

Name
Oconostota's Cherokee name, according to Mooney, was "Aganstata," which he translated as "groundhog-sausage" (agana: "groundhog"; tsistau : "I am pounding it". His name is written as "Oconastota" (with two 'a's) on his grave marker at the site that memorializes Chota. Chota had been one of the mother towns of the Overhill Cherokee, and from the late 1740s to 1788 was the chief town of the Cherokee people. It was located in the area of present-day southeastern Tennessee.

Background
Oconostota as born around 1707, one of eleven children, and may have been a son of Moytoy of Tellico. He grew up among the Overhill Cherokee settlements. Oconostota's first wife was Oo-Loo-Sta (Polly) Ani-Wa’Di of the Paint Clan. Her maiden name was Uka of Chota. Their daughter, Nionne Ollie, married his cousin Attakullakulla, his predecessor as First Beloved Man. Some sources claim Nionne Ollie was a Natchez refugee who was adopted as the daughter of Oconostota's wife (as the Cherokee were a matrilineal society, inheritance and descent went through the mother's clan.)

Oconostota first appears in historical records in 1736. He was a prominent warrior among the Cherokee, and was called "The Great Warrior of Chota." He may have been influenced by the German utopian Christian Priber, who lived with the Cherokee from about 1735 to 1739. He transferred his allegiance from the French to the British, and in 1753 led a pro-British Cherokee force against the Choctaw during the French and Indian War. Over the next 12 years the Cherokee fought both with and against the British. But, as more European-American settlers encroached on Cherokee land, the Cherokee threw their support behind the British, who had issued a proclamation to exclude settlers from the Overhill territory.

In February 1760 Oconostata led a retaliatory attack on Fort Prince George in South Carolina, where colonists had imprisoned 29 Cherokee chiefs seeking peace and then executed them. He defeated Col. Archibald Montgomery in Macon County in June 1760 at the Battle of Echoee, and later captured Fort Loudoun near the confluence of the Little Tennessee River and Tennessee River.

Many histories state that Oconostota went to England in either 1730 or 1762, but he was not a member of either delegation. Even during years of tension, Oconostota worked to have diplomatic relations with the colonists. In an unusual honor, John Stuart, Superintendent of Indian Affairs in the Carolinas, sponsored Oconostota for membership in the exclusive St. Andrews Society of Charlestown, South Carolina, for which the headman was approved and received a certificate in 1773.

Oconostota became the First Beloved Man of the Cherokee following the death of his cousin Attakullakulla, sometime around 1775–1777. His tenure was fraught with warfare and struggle, as the American Revolutionary War broke out. In 1780 both the towns of Chota and Tanasi were destroyed by American revolutionary forces during their rebellion against the British and their allies.

Oconostota was believed to have died in either 1782 or 1783. He was buried with his hands on his chest holding a broadsword pointing down his body.

Memorial

During the late 20th-century excavations at the site of Chota, prior to the Tellico Reservoir impoundment, the remains of Oconostota were found. They were identified by a pair of his reading glasses that had been buried with him.

To memorialize this significant town site, the TVA raised land above the flood level of the reservoir, and over the grave site and former site of the Chota council house). Oconostota's remains were reinterred here in the 1970s and marked by a gravestone. It has become a tradition to place a pebble on his gravestone to symbolize the permanence of his memory and legacy, since a stone can never die. In addition, a memorial to the seven Cherokee clans and the nation overall was installed at this site (see photo above).

Notes

References

References
Litton, Gaston L. "The Principal Chiefs of the Cherokee Nation", Chronicles of Oklahoma 15:3 (September 1937) 253-270. (accessed August 28, 2006).
Mooney, James. Myths of the Cherokee, (1900, reprint 1995).
Kelly, James C. "Oconostota", Journal of Cherokee Studies 3:4 (Fall 1978), 221-238.

External links

1710 births
1783 deaths
18th-century Native Americans
18th-century Cherokee people
Chickamauga Cherokee
People from Chota (Cherokee town)
Native American people from Tennessee